Marisol Peña Torres (born 20 January 1960) is a Chilean jurist and educator.

She was a minister of the Constitutional Court of Chile (TC) from 2006 to 2018, serving as its president from 2013 to 2014.

She is a professor at the Faculty of Law and current secretary general of the Pontifical Catholic University of Chile (PUC).

Early life and education
Marisol Peña was born in Santiago on 20 January 1960. She studied law at Rafael Landívar University in Guatemala, and at the PUC. She graduated in 1981 with maximum distinction, and received the Monsignor Carlos Casanueva and Luis Gutiérrez Allende awards for her academic performance and participation in activities at the PUC Faculty of Law. She earned her law degree the following year.

She completed a master's degree in international studies at the University of Chile in 2002.

Academic and professional career
Peña has taught at the PUC since 1982, where she occupies the chairs of political law, public international law, and constitutional law. She took over the latter in 1991 after the murder of professor and senator Jaime Guzmán. She has received the school's awards for "teaching excellence" and "recognition of teaching excellence".

Together with professor , she organized the master's and postgraduate programs in constitutional law at the PUC Faculty of Law, and was its first academic secretary. In 2005, she was elected a member of the faculty's council and, at the beginning of 2006, director of the public law department. In June 2018, she became secretary general of the PUC.

Since 2004, she has been a member of the board of directors of the Chilean Constitutional Law Association.

She has published articles related to matters of political, constitutional, and international law in several national legal journals.

She has also practiced as a lawyer for the Municipalities Division of the Office of the Comptroller General, and legal advisor to the Ministries of the General Secretariat of Government and the General Secretariat of the Presidency.

Minister of the Constitutional Court

In June 2009, the plenary session of the Supreme Court ratified her as TC minister for a new nine-year term.

During her time on the court, she stood out for her conservative positions, including votes in favor of the unconstitutionality of the distribution of Levonorgestrel (the "morning after pill") in the public health system, and the Inter-American Development Bank loan to Transantiago.

On 22 August 2013, she was elected president of the TC, a position she assumed on 26 August, becoming the first woman to serve as such.

She resigned as TC minister on 8 June 2018.

References

External links

 Marisol Peña at the Constitutional Court of Chile

1960 births
21st-century Chilean lawyers
Chilean scholars of constitutional law
Chilean women lawyers
Living people
People from Santiago
Pontifical Catholic University of Chile alumni
Academic staff of the Pontifical Catholic University of Chile
University of Chile alumni
Academic staff of the University of Santiago, Chile